Jan Pająk (12 May 1906 – 1 November 1976) was a Polish footballer. He played in two matches for the Poland national football team from 1933 to 1934.

References

External links
 

1906 births
1976 deaths
Polish footballers
Poland international footballers
Place of birth missing
Association footballers not categorized by position